The 1997 NAIA World Series was the 41st annual tournament hosted by the National Association of Intercollegiate Athletics to determine the national champion of baseball among its member colleges and universities in the United States and Canada.

The tournament was played, for the last time, at Lewis and Clark Park in Sioux City, Iowa.

Brewton–Parker (64–7) defeated Bellevue (NE) (43–16) in a single-game championship series, 8–4, to win the Barons' first NAIA World Series.

Brewton–Parker third baseman Andy Kalcounos was named tournament MVP.

Bracket

Preliminary

Championship

See also
 1997 NCAA Division I baseball tournament
 1997 NCAA Division II baseball tournament
 1997 NCAA Division III baseball tournament
 1997 NAIA Softball World Series

Reference

NAIA World Series
NAIA World Series
NAIA World Series
NAIA World Series